David Means (born October 17, 1961)  is an American short story writer and novelist based in Nyack, New York. His stories have appeared in many publications, including Esquire, The New Yorker, and Harper's. They are frequently set in the Midwest or the Rust Belt, or along the Hudson River in New York.

Biography
Born in Kalamazoo, Michigan, Means graduated from Loy Norrix High School in 1980. He received his bachelor's degree in 1984 from the College of Wooster, where his I.S. was "Bullfighting in Boston and other Poems". He went to graduate school at Columbia University, where he received an MFA in poetry. He has been a part-time member of the English department at Vassar College since 2001. Means is married with two children.

Work
Contemporary Authors writes: "With Means's second collection, Assorted Fire Events: Stories, he was compared favorably to such esteemed writers as Raymond Carver and Alice Munro and praised by critics for his sharp prose." James Wood, in The London Review of Books notes that "Means' language offers an exquisitely precise and sensuous register of an often crazy American reality.  Sentences gleaming with lustre are sewn through the stories. One will go a long way with a writer possessed of such skill. You can hear the influence of Flannery O'Connor in Means' prose: in the scintillating shiver of the beautiful imagery, in the lack of sentimentality, in the interest in grotesque violence, and gothic tricksterism."  Eileen Battersby in The Irish Times has compared Means' work to that of Eudora Welty and John Cheever.

His first novel is Hystopia. It was long listed for the Man Booker Prize in 2016.

Bibliography

Novels 
 Hystopia (2016)

Short fiction
Collections
A Quick Kiss of Redemption (1991) 
Assorted Fire Events (2000) 
The Secret Goldfish (2004) 
The Spot (2010) 
Instructions for a Funeral (2019) 
Two Nurses, Smoking (2022) 
"Clementine, Carmelita, Dog"
"Are You Experienced?"
"Two Nurses, Smoking"
"Vows"
"Lightning Speaks!"
"The Red Dot"
"I Am Andrew Wyeth!"
"First Encounter"
"Stopping Distance"
"The Depletion Prompts"

Uncollected Short Stories

Anthologies
Fakes: An Anthology of Pseudo-Interviews, Faux-Lectures, Quasi-Letters, "Found" Texts, and Other Fraudulent Artifacts, edited by David Shields and Matthew Vollmer, W. W. Norton, 2012

Awards 
Los Angeles Times Book Prize (2000) for Assorted Fire Events
National Book Critics Circle Award (Finalist, 2000) for Assorted Fire Events
The Pushcart Prize (2001)
O. Henry Prize (2006) for "Sault Ste. Marie"
Frank O'Connor International Short Story Award (Shortlist, 2005) for The Secret Goldfish
O. Henry Prize (2011) for "The Junction"

References

External links 
 New York Times interview with David Means
New Yorker interview with David Means
The Guardian (London) review of The Spot
 Leonard Lopate Show radio interview with David Means
Time Out review of The Spot
Chicago Tribune review of The Spot
Interview with David Means
 "Elective Mute" (Story) from Esquire
 Ponteri, Jay. "David Means and the Secret Mystery". Loggernaut, 2005. Long interview discussing the author's work.
Radio interview in which David Means discusses his book Assorted Fire Events and reads his short story The Woodcutter
 Interview at Powells.com
 Short story "The Knocking" at The New Yorker
 2010 Short story collection "The Spot"
New York Times Review of The Secret Goldfish
Essay about stories by David Means
 Artist George Condo on David Means
 David Means reads "Chef's House" by Raymond Carver/New Yorker/short interview

1961 births
American short story writers
College of Wooster alumni
Columbia University School of the Arts alumni
Living people
Writers from Kalamazoo, Michigan
People from Nyack, New York
The New Yorker people
Vassar College faculty